Robert Abbot was an English theologian who promoted puritan doctrines. With a living at Cranbrook, Kent, he wrote anti-Catholic works and cultivated a local circle among the Kent gentry.

Biography
Robert Abbot received his education at Cambridge University, and later at
Oxford University. The details of Abbot's ecclesiastical career are somewhat unclear, and can only be pieced together from fragmentary evidence, but based on something he wrote in his work Bee Thankfull London and her Sisters, it is probable that he began his church service with a posting as "assistant to a reverend divine". A note in the margin indicates that the priest in question was "Master Haiward of Wool Church", in Dorset. In 1616 he was appointed by George Abbot to the vicarage of Cranbrook in Kent. His ministry at Cranbrook was regarded as successful, but he was noted for his lack of tolerance towards nonconformists. In 1643, Abbot left Cranbrook, becoming vicar of Southwick, Hampshire. Later, he became pastor at the "extruded" Udall of St Austin's, in London, where he apparently still served in 1657. Between 1657 and 1658, and in 1662, Abbot appears to vanish from record, and his activities are unknown.

Written works
Robert Abbot's books are conspicuous amongst the works of his time by their terseness and variety. In addition to those mentioned above he wrote Triall of our Church-Forsakers (1639), Milk for Babes, or a Mother's Catechism for her Children (1646), and A Christian Family builded by God, or Directions for Governors of Families (1653).

Identification of father
Abbot is sometimes mistakenly described as the son of the Archbishop of Canterbury of the same surname, George Abbot. The misunderstanding may stem from a passage in Robert Abbot's work A Hand of Fellowship to Helpe Keepe out Sinne and Antichrist, in which he thanks the Archbishop for "worldly maintenance," "best earthly countenance" and "fatherly incouragements."

References

Attribution
  Cited authorities:
 Brook's Puritans, iii. 182, 3;
 John Walker's Sufferings, ii.183;
 Anthony Wood's Athenae (editor Philip Bliss), i.323;
 Samuel Palmer's Nonconformist's Memorial ii. 218, which confuses him with one of the ejected ministers of 1662.

1580s births
1660s deaths
English Christian theologians
17th-century English Puritan ministers
17th-century English theologians
Alumni of the University of Oxford
Alumni of Jesus College, Cambridge
English religious writers
17th-century English male writers
17th-century English writers
People from Cranbrook, Kent